Joseph Porta may refer to:

 Giuseppe Porta (1520–1575), Italian painter
 Joseph Della Porta, an English department store, founded by Joseph Della Porta